The King's Manor is a Grade I listed building in York, England, and is part of the University of York.  It lies on Exhibition Square, in the city centre.

History
King's Manor was originally built to house the abbots of St Mary's Abbey, York. The Abbot's house probably occupied the site since the eleventh century, but the earliest remains date from the fifteenth century.  When the abbey was dissolved in 1539, Henry VIII instructed that it be the seat of the Council of the North. It performed this role until the council was abolished in 1641.

Thomas Cecil, Lord Burghley was President of the Council of the North in 1603 when Elizabeth I died. He wrote to Sir Robert Cecil that he had moved out of the house, so that the new king, James VI and I, could stay there on his journey south to London. The house was empty of furnishings and "quite out of order". Lord Burghley stocked the wine cellars and larders. King James came to the "Manor of St Mary's" on 16 April 1603 and stayed in York for three days. The buildings were upgraded and embellished by Thomas Wentworth, President of the North from 1628 to 1631, with new doorways and coats of arms.

From 1667 to 1688, the manor was the residence of the Governor of York. During the Glorious Revolution of 1688, the Governor, Sir John Reresby, 2nd Baronet, remained loyal to the King, James II, but a party of armed men, led by Thomas Osborne, Earl of Danby, captured the Manor and the City of York, and held them for William of Orange. After 1688, the building was hired out to private tenants until the nineteenth century, when it was taken over and expanded by the Yorkshire School for the Blind.

For a detailed description of the history and architecture of the building, perhaps the best source is that contained in the RCHME Inventory of the City of York, Volume IV.

In April 2022 there were reports of criminal damage to the manor. It was reported that several windows had been broken and that blood was found at the scene, presumed to have been caused by broken glass.

The University of York 
On the departure of the Blind School in 1958, the Manor was acquired by York City Council, who leased it to the university in 1963.  The main University later moved to the Heslington Campus. From 1966, the principal academic department to use the Manor was the Institute of Advanced Architectural Studies (IoAAS). The IoAAS was a leading UK provider of mid-career education for architects and related professionals, specialising latterly in architectural conservation studies. The main public room of the Manor is the Huntingdon Room, used for courses and meetings. As well as the IoAAS, there were several other Departments in the King's Manor, the main ones being the Centre for Medieval Studies, a Language Teaching centre and the Design Unit (an architectural practice, but part of the IoAAS). The building also housed six University staff flats. The Dining Room provided an important place for the meeting of ‘town and gown’, especially in the early years of the university. Following the closure of the IoAAS in 1997, the main occupant became the Department of Archaeology (including the Archaeology Data Service), plus the Centre for Medieval Studies and the Centre for Eighteenth Century Studies.

See also
History of York

References

External links

The University's page on King's Manor

Grade I listed buildings in York
Grade I listed houses
University of York